Navioideae is a subfamily of the bromeliad family, Bromeliaceae. It contains four or five genera, formerly placed in a more broadly defined subfamily Pitcairnioideae.

Genera
, the Encyclopaedia of Bromeliads accepted five genera, while Plants of the World Online accepted four.
 Brewcaria L.B.Sm., Steyerm. & H.Rob. (may be included in Navia)
 Cottendorfia Schult.f.
 Navia Schult. & Schult.f.
 Sequencia (L.B.Sm.) Givnish
 Steyerbromelia L.B.Sm.

References

 
Commelinid subfamilies